Sultana Bibiana is a 2017 Bangladeshi romantic film directed by Himel Ashraf. The film got huge response from the audience.

Plot 
The young man is the Sultan (Bappy Chowdhury). His nature of the way and the way of moving around. For unknown reasons, he came to the state of flower one day. The two eyes filled with the boy's eyes. Sultan's great love for flowers, and hanging Mali Afaz of flower gardens. Flower lover nature lover sultan stabilizes, at the festoon of flowers. It goes from its good states. Begin with his nature. The bird came in the flower garden, but the bird is a manlike bird. The name is her Sonali (Achol). The story ongoing then. Shonali falls in love with Sultan. However, Shonali's father won't allow her marriage with Sultan.

Cast
 Bappy Chowdhury
 Achol
 Shahiduzzaman Selim
 Mamunur Rashid
 Amit Hasan

References

External links
 
 Official trailer
 Bangla Movie Database

2017 films
Bengali-language Bangladeshi films
Bangladeshi drama films
2010s Bengali-language films
2017 drama films